Bai Tu Long Bay is a bay in Vietnam. It encompasses Bai Tu Long National Park. Bai Tu Long Bay is northeast of Hạ Long Bay.

Bai Tu Long National Park 

Bai Tu Long bay National Park is a protected area zone in northeastern Vietnam. It was established in 2001, succeeding from the former Ba Mun National Conservation Zone. It is one of seven Vietnamese amphibian national parks which has both terrestrial zone and aquatic zone.

According to legend, an immense dragon descended to Hạ Long Bay (meaning ‘’Descending Dragon’’) millions years ago, dropping numerous eggs. These eggs hatched forming thousands of  rocks and islands. The tail of the dragon extended far to the sea, forming Bach Long Vi island (meaning "The Tail of the White Dragon"). As she returned to heaven, she said good bye to her offspring at the Bai Tu Long Bay (means "The dragon parts the offspring"). Now the park is part of Van Don District, 20 km distant from Cai Rong town.

During the 27th meeting of ASEAN Senior Officials on Environment in 2016, Bai Tu Long bay was officially endorsed as the 38th ASEAN Heritage Park.

Geography
The exactly geographical position is in a rectangle between 20°55'05" and 21°15'10" North latitude, 107°30'10" and 107°46'20" East longitude. It administratively consists of 3 communes: Minh Chau, Van Yen and Ha Long of Van Don District.

It is composed from a terrestrial area of 61.25 km2 and an aquatic area of 96.58 km2. The zone includes over 40 islands and rocks. They form three groups: Ba Mun group, Tra Ngo group and Sau group. The aquatic area includes the sea zone between the islands and the narrows between the park area and the land area which has boundary of 1 km offshore.
The national park also includes a buffer zone of approximately 165.34 km2, which is located in a larger area including five communes: Minh Chau, Vạn Yen, Ban Sen, Quan Lan and Ha Long. The total population of the core zone and the buffer zone is around 24,000.

Ecosystem
The national park includes five kinds of ecosystems: rain/broad-leaf forest, limestone forest, littoral forest, coral area and shallow water area.

The rain/broad-leaf forest area is mostly secondary forest. The average canopy covers 50 – 90%. 494 species belonging to 337 genera of 117 families have been found in this type of ecosystem. Some endangered species include Cycas balansae, Radix marindae officinalis, Ardisia sylvestris Pitard, Smilax glabra, leopard cat (Prionailurus bengalensis), Indian muntjac (Muntiacus muntjak), small Indian civet (Viverricula indica), large Indian civet (Viverra zibetha).

The limestone forest area is forest growing in poor soil with particles of limestone on rocky islands. Some rare animals found there include serow, rhesus macaque.

The littoral ecosystem in the park is small areas surrounding the islands. It has a rather large tidal variation and is biologically highly diverse with  251 species including 19 species of mangrove, 17 species  of seaweed, 29 species of marine worms, 149 species of molluscs, 22 species of crustaceans and 15 species of echinoderms.

The coral area is located from the water depths of low tide to 10m deep. 409 species have been found including groupers, sea bass, crabs, snails, abalone and seaweeds.

The shallow water area covers a large area around the islands, beyond the tidal area and extending from 1 km to around 4 km. These areas have not been profoundly researched but 539 species have been found.

See also
Ha Long Bay

References

External links
 Official website
Vietnam National Parks & Reserves
Environmental capacity Halong Bay – Bai Tu Long. Publisher: Natural Science and Technology. Hanoi. Editor: Nguyen Khoa Son,  – In Vietnamese

National parks of Vietnam
Geography of Quảng Ninh province
Protected areas established in 2001
ASEAN heritage parks
Bays of Vietnam